The Second Amendment of the Constitution Act 1941 (previously bill no. 40 of 1941) is an amendment of the Constitution of Ireland that was in the form of omnibus legislation affecting a variety of articles on a range of subject matters. It was signed into law on 30 May 1941.

Background
The most important changes introduced by the amendment included restrictions on the right to habeas corpus, an extension of the right of the government to declare a state of emergency, changes to provisions on the reference of bills to the Supreme Court by the President and various changes that were needed to bring the official Irish text of the constitution into line with the English text. An unusual aspect of the Second Amendment was that it introduced a change to Article 56 of the Transitory Provisions even though that article was no longer a part of the official published text of the constitution.

The Second Amendment was not submitted to a referendum. Under Article 51 of the Transitory Provisions, the constitution could be amended during the initial period of 1938 to 1941 without the need for a referendum and so the Second Amendment could be adopted in the same manner as any other law. The amendment was adopted partly as the last chance to implement a list of desired changes before the provisions of Article 51 lapsed. The amendment was enacted during the Fianna Fáil government of Éamon de Valera.

Overview of changes
The Second Amendment introduced the following changes to the constitution:
Reference of bills to the Supreme Court: Altered Article 26, which deals with the referral by the president of a bill to the Supreme Court to test its constitutionality. Most importantly, the amendment introduced a requirement that when ruling on a bill referred to it by the president under his reserve powers, the Supreme Court can issue only one opinion, and no dissenting opinions are permitted. That was in keeping with the practice in many civil law supreme courts and was intended to promote legal certainty. However, the provision that was added by Article 26 applies only for presidential references of bills, and the Supreme Court may still issue dissenting opinions in all other circumstances. A further alteration to Article 34 provided that a law that has survived a reference to the Supreme Court can never again have its constitutionality challenged.
Habeas corpus: Altered Article 40, dealing with habeas corpus. Before the Second Amendment, detained individuals had the constitutional right to apply to any High Court judge for a writ of habeas corpus and to as many High Court judges as they wished. Since the Second Amendment, prisoners have a right to apply to only one judge, and once a writ had been issued, the President of the High Court has the authority to choose the judge or a panel of three judges to decide the case. The amendment also added that when the High Court believes someone's detention to be invalid because of the unconstitutionality of a law, it must refer the matter to the Supreme Court and may release the individual only on bail in the interim. Another new provision gave the High Court authority to defer a death sentence while it was considering a writ of habeas corpus. That particular provision became defunct with the abolition of capital punishment and has since been removed by the Twenty-first Amendment in 2002.
National emergency: Altered Article 28 so that an officially-declared "time of war or armed rebellion" could be ended only by a resolution of both houses of the Oireachtas.
Irish text: Made various changes to the official Irish text to bring it into line with the English text. That was necessary because while the constitution was being drafted, Dáil Éireann made a number of changes to the English text while accidentally neglecting to make equivalent changes to the Irish document. Rectifying that problem was especially important because under the constitution, the Irish text has precedence over the English text.
Presidential vacancies: Altered Article 12.3.3º, which provides that in the event of the death, resignation or permanent incapacity of the president, a presidential election must occur within 60 days. The phrase "(whether occurring before or after he enters upon his office)" was added to clarify that the requirement would apply even if the president-elect had not yet assumed office. The Second Amendment also introduced to Article 14, which deals with the temporary exercise of the powers of the president by the Presidential Commission or the Council of State, a slight change to the wording to clarify that the organs may exercise not only the president's constitutional duties but also any additional duties that are conferred upon the president by law.
Senate: Altered Article 18 to clarify that senators nominated by the Taoiseach must be nominated by the Taoiseach who is appointed after the general election that is held immediately before the election of Seanad Éireann. An alteration was also made to the text of Article 24.2, which deals with the procedure if the time for the consideration of a bill in the Senate has been abridged.
Promulgation of laws: Introduced minor changes to Article 25, altering the precise procedure to be used in the signing, promulgation and enrolment of laws. It also added a new provision allowing the Taoiseach to enrol an official copy of the constitution with the registrar of the Supreme Court.
Reference of bills to the people: Introduced minor changes to the procedure for the reference of bills to the people under the reserve powers of the president. For example, it provided that the signatures on a petition to the president for a referendum must be verified in accordance to the law.
In camera court hearings: Altered Article 34 to provide that in "special and limited cases", a court may administer justice in camera.
Transitory Provisions: Altered Article 56 to clarify the protections given to employees who had begun working for the government before the constitution was enacted. The change was unusual because by 1941, most of the Transitory Provisions, including Article 56, had been removed from all official published texts of the constitution. The provisions required their own omission on the grounds that they would no longer be relevant. However, most of the Transitory Provisions continued to have force of law and so could still be changed by a constitutional amendment.

See also
Constitutional amendment
History of the Republic of Ireland
Politics of the Republic of Ireland

References

External links
 Second Amendment of the Constitution Act 1941 - Irish Statute Book
 Second Amendment of the Constitution Bill 1940 - Oireachtas site, including debates
 Full text of the Constitution of Ireland
 Chapter XIV: Constitutional Challenges and the Second Amendment, 1939–41 from The Origins of the Irish Constitution, RIA

1941 in Irish law
1941 in Irish politics
02
May 1941 events